Sybra miscanthivola is a species of beetle in the family Cerambycidae. It was described by Makihara in 1977.

References

miscanthivola
Beetles described in 1977